Apalachicola is a city and the county seat of Franklin County, Florida, United States, on the shore of Apalachicola Bay, an inlet of the Gulf of Mexico. The population was 2,231 at the 2010 census.

History

The Apalachicola Province, after whom the river and, ultimately the city, are named, lived along the lower part of the Chattahoochee River in Alabama and Georgia in historic times, until the 1830s (the Spanish included the Chattahoochee as part of the Apalachicola River). The name is a combination of the Hitchiti words apalahchi, meaning "on the other side", and okli, meaning "people". In original reference to the settlement, it probably meant "people on the other side of the river".

Between the years 1513 and 1763, the area that now includes the city of Apalachicola was under Spanish jurisdiction as part of Spanish Florida. While the Spanish established missions with the Apalachee people to the northeast of the city of Apalachicola (centered around Tallahassee), and with the Chatot people to the north in the upper Apalachicola River valley and the Chipola River valley, the Spanish did not establish any missions in the area of the lower Apalachicola River during the duration of Spain's first occupation of Florida. In the 1750s, during the French and Indian War, the British captured the Spanish colony of Cuba; however, because Cuba was a prized possession for the Spanish and Florida was mostly unused backwater, the Spanish traded Florida to the British in return for regaining Cuba. Between the years 1763 and 1783, the area that is now Apalachicola fell under the jurisdiction of British West Florida. A British trading post called "Cottonton" was founded at this site on the mouth of the Apalachicola River. In 1783, British West Florida was transferred to Spain; however, the trading post (and its British inhabitants) remained and continued facilitating trade along the Apalachicola River (which was connected to the trading network along the Chattahoochee River). Gradually, after acquisition by the United States and related development in Alabama and Georgia, it attracted more permanent European-American residents. In 1827, the town was incorporated as "West Point". Apalachicola received its current name in 1831, by an act of the Legislative Council of the Territory of Florida.

Trinity Episcopal Church was incorporated by an act of the Legislative Council of the Territory of Florida on February 11, 1837. The building was one of the earliest prefabricated buildings in the United States. The framework was shipped by schooner from New York City and assembled in Apalachicola with wooden pegs.

Botanist Alvan Wentworth Chapman settled in Apalachicola in 1847. In 1860, he published his major work, Flora of the Southern United States. An elementary school was later named in his honor.

On April 3, 1862, during the American Civil War, the gunboat  and the steamer  (relieving the ) captured Apalachicola. Union forces that occupied west Florida during much of the war moved here.

In 1849, Apalachicola physician Dr. John Gorrie discovered the cold-air process of refrigeration and patented an ice machine in 1850. He had experimented to find ways to lower the body temperature of fever patients. His patent laid the groundwork for development of modern refrigeration and air conditioning, making Florida and the South more livable year-round. The city has a monument to him, and a replica of his ice machine is on display in the John Gorrie Museum. The John Gorrie Memorial Bridge, carrying the main road out of Apalachicola, U.S. 98, is named for him.

Before railroads reached the region in the later 19th century, Apalachicola was the third-busiest port on the Gulf of Mexico (behind New Orleans and Mobile). Scheduled boats transported passengers and goods up and down the Apalachicola, Chattahoochee, and Flint rivers to Albany and Columbus, Georgia. A paddle steamer, the Crescent City, made a daily round trip to Carrabelle, carrying the mail as well as passengers and freight.

The AN Railway, formerly the Apalachicola Northern Railroad, serves the city.

Originally built in 1935 and rebuilt in 1988, the John Gorrie Memorial Bridge carries U.S. 98 across Apalachicola Bay to Eastpoint.

Geography

Apalachicola is located in the northwestern part of the state on Apalachicola Bay and at the mouth of the Apalachicola River. U.S. 98 is the main highway through town, leading east across the bay to Eastpoint and northwest  to Panama City.

Climate
The climate of Apalachicola is humid subtropical (Köppen Cfa), with short, mild winters and hot, humid summers.

Demographics

As of the census of 2000, there were 2,334 people, 1,006 households, and 608 families residing in the city. The population density was 1,242.1 inhabitants per square mile (479.3/km). The racial makeup of the city was 63.41% White, 34.92% African American, 0.17% Native American, 0.39% Asian, 0.47% from other races, and 0.64% from two or more races. Hispanic or Latino of any race were 1.67% of the population.

There were 1,006 households, out of which 23.4% had children under the age of 18 living with them, 41.8% were married couples living together, 15.0% had a female householder with no husband present, and 39.5% were non-families. Of all households, 34.7% were made up of individuals, and 14.8% had someone living alone who was 65 years of age or older. The average household size was 2.24 and the average family size was 2.87.

In the city, the population was spread out, with 21.9% under the age of 18, 7.0% from 18 to 24, 24.0% from 25 to 44, 26.7% from 45 to 64, and 20.5% who were 65 years of age or older. The median age was 43 years. For every 100 females, there were 90.2 males. For every 100 females age 18 and over, there were 86.3 males.

The median income for a household in the city was $23,073, and the median income for a family was $28,464. Males had a median income of $22,500 versus $18,750 for females. The per capita income for the city was $12,227. About 19.9% of families and 25.3% of the population were below the poverty line, including 32.4% of those under age 18 and 15.0% of those age 65 or over.

Economy
Apalachicola is still the home port for a variety of seafood workers, including recreational fishing and shrimpers. More than 90% of Florida's oyster production was harvested from Apalachicola Bay in past years. Today the oyster industry has completely collapsed due to pollution and lack of water flow in the Apalachicola River. Every year the town hosts the Florida Seafood Festival. The bay is well protected by St. Vincent Island, Flag Island, Sand Island, St. George Island, and Cape St. George Island.

In 1979, Exxon relocated their experimental subsea production system from offshore Louisiana to a permitted artificial reef site off Apalachicola. This was the first effort to turn an oil platform into an artificial reef.

Arts and culture
Apalachicola is home to the Dixie Theatre, a professional Equity theater which is also a live performance venue. Built in 1912, the theatre was fully renovated beginning in 1996.

Education
Apalachicola is a part of the Franklin County Schools system.  As of the 2008–2009 school year, all students, except those attending charter schools, attended the K–12 Franklin County School. Apalachicola Bay Charter School is also located in Apalachicola.

Wallace M. Quinn High School

Notable people

 Jimmy Bloodworth, major League baseball player
 Alvin Wentworth Chapman, botanist
 John Gorrie, inventor of mechanical cooling
 Mary Rogers Gregory, artist
 Richard Heyser, U-2 pilot

References

External links

 City of Apalachicola official website
 Apalachicola Bay Chamber of Commerce

 
Cities in Franklin County, Florida
County seats in Florida
Populated places on the Intracoastal Waterway in Florida
Cities in Florida
1827 establishments in Florida Territory
Populated places established in 1827
List of place names of Choctaw origin in the United States